The Polynesia Cup 1998 was the second Polynesia-wide tournament ever held. It took place in Cook Islands and five teams participated: Tahiti, Samoa, American Samoa, Tonga and the hosts Cook Islands for the first time and served for the second time as Oceania Nations Cup qualifyer.

The teams played each other according to a round-robin format with  winning the tournament for the second time and qualifying to the Oceania Nations Cup 1998 along with

Results

Tahiti and  Cook Islands qualified for Oceania Nations Cup 1998

References

Polynesia Cup
1998–99 in OFC football
International association football competitions hosted by the Cook Islands
1998 in Cook Islands sport
1998 OFC Nations Cup